WNCB-LD, virtual channel 16 (UHF digital channel 29), is a low-powered Estrella TV-affiliated television station licensed to Fayetteville, North Carolina, serving the Raleigh, North Carolina, United States. The station is owned by south Florida-based DTV America Corporation.

WNCB-LD has no relation to the Cary-licensed FM station WNCB, which also serves the Raleigh-Durham-Fayetteville market.

History
The station was established as W15DH-D in 2011 under a construction permit, slated to be broadcast on UHF channel 15. It changed its call letters to the current WNCB-LD in 2013, and took to the air in January 2014 as an Estrella TV affiliate.

Programming
WNCB-LD offers Estrella TV programming on the main channel, while Doctor TV, a new healthy lifestyle-oriented network, is being run on the second digital sub-channel.  Beginning in late July 2015, the Sonlife Broadcasting Network began airing on the third digital sub-channel.

Digital channels
The station's digital signal is multiplexed:

References

External links
Query the FCC’s TV database for WNCB 
RabbitEars.info Query for WNCB-LD 
DTV America
Doctor TV website
Sonlife Broadcasting Network website

Television stations in North Carolina
Low-power television stations in the United States
Innovate Corp.
Estrella TV affiliates